Maurice Van Damme (born 1888) was a Belgian fencer. He won a silver and bronze medal at the 1924 Summer Olympics.

References

External links
 

1888 births
Year of death missing
Belgian male fencers
Belgian foil fencers
Olympic fencers of Belgium
Fencers at the 1924 Summer Olympics
Olympic silver medalists for Belgium
Olympic bronze medalists for Belgium
Olympic medalists in fencing
Medalists at the 1924 Summer Olympics